Wazeba (early 4th century), vocalized by historians as Wazeba, or WZB was a Negus of the Kingdom of Aksum, centered in the highlands of modern Ethiopia and Eritrea. He succeeded Aphilas. Wazeba is known only from the coins that he minted during his reign. He was the first Aksumite ruler to engrave the legends of his coins in Ge'ez, and the only King of Aksum to use that language on his gold currency. S. C. Munro-Hay suggests that the scarcity of Wazeba's coins may hint at a short reign.

There is one coin issue that combines a die from Wazeba on the obverse and a die from Ousanas on the reverse. S.C. Munro-Hay suggests that these two kings may have been co-rulers. Wolfgang Hahn and Vincent West instead suggested that Wazeba was an usurper who interrupted the reign of Ousanas.

Wazeba's coins were the first Aksumite coins to use the script and language (Ge'ez), with some variations on the regalia on gold coins. The standard design was restored by Ousanas.

Notes 

Kings of Axum
4th-century monarchs in Africa